Marcello Borges (born September 13, 1997) is an American soccer player who plays for Atlantic City in the NPSL.

Career

Youth, College and Amateur
Borges spent his entire youth career with the New York Red Bulls Academy.  On February 4, 2015, it was announced that Borges signed a letter of intent to play college soccer at the University of Michigan.  A month later, he signed an academy level contract with USL club New York Red Bulls II, which allowed him to play for the club without forfeiting his college eligibility.  He made his debut a day later in a goalless draw against Rochester Rhinos.

In his freshman year with the Wolverines, Borges made only 11 appearances, starting in five of them.  He missed a portion of the season due to the fact he was on U.S. U-20 national team duty.

He also played in the Premier Development League for New York Red Bulls U-23.

He was drafted by the Colorado Rapids of Major League Soccer in the 2019 MLS SuperDraft.

International
Borges has represented the United States in the under-18 and under-20 level.

Career statistics

References

External links
Michigan bio

1997 births
Living people
American soccer players
Association football defenders
Colorado Rapids draft picks
Colorado Rapids players
Detroit City FC players
Flint City Bucks players
Michigan Wolverines men's soccer players
National Premier Soccer League players
New York Red Bulls II players
New York Red Bulls U-23 players
People from Kearny, New Jersey
Soccer players from New Jersey
Sportspeople from Hudson County, New Jersey
United States men's under-20 international soccer players
United States men's youth international soccer players
USL Championship players
USL League Two players